The Native Courts Ordinance was a law in the Sudan, passed by the Anglo-Egyptian colonial authorities in 1932. The law conveyed judicial and political powers to government-recognized sheikhs in the northern areas of the country. The sheikhs were, through this law, charged with tax collection, overseeing infrastructure constructions and administering ‘native areas’ and given the authority to issue punishments upon the local population. Through this law, and the corresponding Chiefs Courts Ordinance for the southern parts of the Sudan, introduced what would be termed the ‘Native Administration’ by the British colonial system.

References

Law of Sudan